Mohd Farizal bin Marlias (born 29 June 1986) is a Malaysian professional footballer who plays as a goalkeeper for Malaysia Super League club Johor Darul Ta'zim. He also played for the Malaysian Pre-Olympic squad.

Club career
Farizal started his professional career with Shahzan Muda. He spent two seasons playing in the Premier League Malaysia. He transferred to Perlis and wore the number one jersey for two seasons.

In 2011, he joined Negeri Sembilan. Initially he became second-choice goalkeeper to Mohd Farizal Harun, but he gradually becomes the number one goalkeeper after recovering from injury and subsequently helped his team winning the 2011 Malaysia Cup.

He joined Perak at the end of 2012 and played 19 league matches and 5 Malaysia Cup matches in 2013. At the end of the season he left Perak and joined Selangor.

In 2015 season he joins Johor Darul Ta'zim (JDT) and selected as the first choice goalkeeper. He made his 200th appearances in all competition for JDT in 2022 Malaysia Super League match against Sarawak United.

International career

Farizal was selected as the third choice goalkeeper for the 2008 AFF Suzuki Cup after Badrulzaman Abdul Halim was dropped because of injury.

On 12 July 2009, Farizal earned his first senior international appearance in an unofficial matches against Zimbabwe. He later made his full international debut against Kenya.

He also featured with Malaysia Selection in the exhibition match against Manchester United in which he conceded three goals in the first game and two goals in the second game. In the first game, he assisted Mohd Amri Yahyah who scored a beautiful volley outside the penalty box.

In 2010, Malaysian coach K. Rajagobal called up Farizal for the 2010 AFF Suzuki Cup, but he was later ruled out by injury during a league match with Perlis. He was later replaced by Mohd Sharbinee Allawee Ramli.

In 2011, Farizal made his international comeback when he came on as a substitute against Hong Kong in February. In July, he was selected to play for Malaysia Selection in a match against Chelsea. He keep a clean sheet for the Malaysian side before being replaced by Harimau Muda A keeper Mohd Izham Tarmizi in the 75th minute.

However, since Kim Pan-Gon was made in charge of the Malaysian national football team in 2022, he was deemed too short to play in goal, losing his spot to taller, younger goalkeepers.

Career statistics

Club

International

Honours

Club
Negeri Sembilan
 Malaysia Cup: 2011
 Malaysia Charity Shield: 2012

Johor Darul Ta'zim
 Malaysia Cup: 2017, 2019, 2022
 Malaysia Charity Shield: 2015, 2016, 2019, 2020, 2021, 2022, 2023
 Malaysia Super League: 2015, 2016, 2017, 2018, 2019, 2020, 2021, 2022
 Malaysia FA Cup: 2016, 2022
 AFC Cup: 2015

International
 Southeast Asian Games: 2009 Gold Medal
 AFF Championship runner-up: 2014, 2018

Individual
 FAM Football Awards – Best Goalkeeper Award: 2009 – Perlis
 FAM Football Awards – Best Goalkeeper Award: 2015 – Johor Darul Ta'zim
 FAM Football Awards – Best Goalkeeper Award: 2018 – Johor Darul Ta'zim
 FAM Football Awards – Best Goalkeeper Award: 2019 – Johor Darul Ta'zim
 FAM Football Awards – Best Goalkeeper Award: 2020 – Johor Darul Ta'zim
 FAM Football Awards – Best Goalkeeper Award: 2021 – Johor Darul Ta'zim

References

External links
 Profile at ifball.com
 
 
 Farizal Marlias Statistics

Living people
1986 births
People from Pahang
Malaysian people of Malay descent
Malaysian footballers
Malaysia international footballers
Negeri Sembilan FA players
Perak F.C. players
Perlis FA players
Selangor FA players
Johor Darul Ta'zim F.C. players
Malaysia Super League players
Association football goalkeepers
AFC Cup winning players
Southeast Asian Games gold medalists for Malaysia
Southeast Asian Games medalists in football
21st-century Malaysian people